is a passenger railway station located in the town of Ayagawa, Kagawa, Japan.  It is operated by the private transportation company Takamatsu-Kotohira Electric Railroad (Kotoden) and is designated station "K16".

Lines
Hayuka Station is a statin on the Kotoden Kotohira Line and is located 22.8 km from the opposing terminus of the line at Takamatsu-Chikkō Station.

Layout
The station consists of one side platform serving a single bi-directional track. The station is unattended.

Adjacent stations

History
Hayuka Station opened on March 15, 1927 as a station of the Kotohira Electric Railway. On November 1, 1943 it became  a station on the Takamatsu Kotohira Electric Railway Kotohira Line due to a company merger.

Surrounding area
Ayagawa Municipal Hayuka Elementary School
Japan National Route 32
Japan National Route 377

Passenger statistics

See also
 List of railway stations in Japan

References

External links

  

Railway stations in Japan opened in 1927
Railway stations in Kagawa Prefecture
Ayagawa, Kagawa